Love's Awakening is a 1936 German drama film directed by Herbert Maisch and starring Eugen Klöpfer, Karin Hardt and Hans Schlenck. It was shot at the Marienfelde Studios of Terra Film in Berlin.

Cast
 Eugen Klöpfer as Dr. Bergriedel - Bezirkstierarzt
 Karin Hardt as Hanni - his daughter
 Hans Schlenck as Dr. Breitner - his Assistant
 Walter Rilla as Robert Lund - Violinvirtuose
 Walter Steinbeck as Dudek - his Manager
 Eliza Illiard as Dora Brink
 Heinz Salfner as Mr. Burns - American concert agent
 Gina Falckenberg as Lilian - his daughter
 Josefine Dora as Frau Schupperer
 Wolfgang von Schwindt as the hotel porter
 Anita Düwell
 Franz Klebusch
 Erich Dunskus
 Angelo Ferrari
 Heinrich Schlusnus as Singer

References

Bibliography 
 Klaus, Ulrich J. Deutsche Tonfilme: Jahrgang 1936. Klaus-Archiv, 1988.

External links 
 

1936 films
Films of Nazi Germany
German drama films
1936 drama films
1930s German-language films
Films directed by Herbert Maisch
Terra Film films
German black-and-white films
1930s German films
Films shot at Terra Studios